Chris Fox (born July 30, 1974) is a retired American soccer defender who played professionally in the National Professional Soccer League and USL First Division.

Fox attended Brown University, where he was a 1995 First Team All Ivy soccer player.  After graduating from Brown, Fox signed with the New York Fever of the A-League.  The Fever waived Fox in August 1996 and the Atlanta Ruckus immediately signed him.  In addition to his outdoor career, Fox also played indoor soccer.  In January 1995, the Buffalo Blizzard selected Fox in the fourth round of the National Professional Soccer League amateur draft.  He signed with the Blizzard in 1996. On February 6, 1998, the Blizzard released Fox to allow him to pursue a possible contract with the Dallas Burn.  By then he was also playing for the Richmond Kickers of the USISL.  He signed with the Kickers in April 1997 and played for them through the 2005 season. In 2001, he was First Team All League.  On February 1, 1998, the Dallas Burn selected Fox in the first round (tenth overall) of the 1998 MLS Supplemental Draft, but was released during the pre-season.

References

External links
 Richmond Kickers: Chris Fox

1974 births
Living people
American soccer players
Atlanta Silverbacks players
Brown Bears men's soccer players
Buffalo Blizzard players
Richmond Kickers players
National Professional Soccer League (1984–2001) players
New York Fever players
USL First Division players
A-League (1995–2004) players
FC Dallas draft picks
New England Revolution draft picks
Association football defenders